The tubarial salivary glands, also known as the tubarial glands, are a pair of salivary glands found in humans between the nasal cavity and throat.

Description

The tubarial glands are found in the lateral walls of the nasopharynx overlying the torus tubarius. The tubarial salivary glands bind to PSMA, which is how they were discovered.

History

The glands were discovered by a group of Dutch scientists at the Netherlands Cancer Institute in September 2020 using PET/CT scans.

Significance 
Most of the significance of the tubarial glands stems from their significance in radiotherapy. It is believed that avoiding the irradiation of the glands will prevent many of the side effects of radiotherapy, such as xerostomia.

References 

Glands
Human throat
2020 in science